Dumitru Bacal is football player who currently is playing for FC Veris.

References
http://moldova.sports.md/dumitru_bacal/stats/

1985 births
Moldovan footballers
Association football defenders
Living people
CS Petrocub Hîncești players
FC Dacia Chișinău players
Moldovan Super Liga players